Hive is a trademark owned by Centrica Hive Limited that produces smart home devices. It is one of the largest connected home providers in the UK and, as of May 2018, the company had more than 1,000,000 customers.

Using the Hive app and website, customers can control a range of internet-connected devices, from a thermostat to lights, smart plugs, motion sensors, and window and door sensors.

History
Before the creation of the Hive brand, British Gas had been trialling a remote control heating service, starting in September 2011, using technology from AlertMe.  This led to the launch of the Remote Heating Control service in 2012 paving the way for the later Hive-branded smart heating system.

Hive was established when parent company Centrica, owner of British Gas, formed its Connected Homes sector in 2012. The year after it was founded, the company launched Hive Active Heating on October 14, 2013, a smart thermostat that allows customers to control heating and hot water in their homes via the company's website or app. The system can be installed in customers' homes by a British Gas engineer.

In February 2015, British Gas purchased the connected home firm AlertMe in a deal worth £65 million. This allowed Hive to build its devices using the Honeycomb platform developed by AlertMe, which facilitates the capability for users to control all their smart home devices through an app. This meant Hive could more closely compete with similar platforms used by rivals such as HomeKit, Project Brillo and Nest Labs.

Hive Active Heating 2, the second edition of the company's smart heating system, was released in July 2015. The new model was upgraded to include two additional features. The holiday mode setting allows customers to set a given temperature while away from home. The boost function allows customers to immediately turn heating and hot water on for a period of up to six hours.

The smart thermostat was designed by Silicon Valley-based, Swiss designer Yves Béhar, who won Design Miami Design Visionary Award in 2015. It was praised for its sleek look, with critics saying it was an improvement on the company's first active heating model, which was criticised for having a dull aesthetic. However, in the same year, complaints about the lack of data security led to changes in the software. The company improved data encryption as a result of an investigation by Which? magazine.

The company also paired up with Dulux to provide accessory frames for the thermostat in a range of different colours.

In 2015 the company announced future plans to use the Honeycomb platform to support and allow integration with third-party products including a Samsung camera.

The company launched two new products in January, 2016. The Active Plug enables users to attach devices, monitor whether they are on or off, remotely-controlling them using a mobile device or laptop. The Window or Door Sensor allows customers to remotely monitor when windows or doors in their home are opened or closed.

The company released the Motion Sensor on February 9, 2016. Customers can use it to keep track of movement within their homes remotely.

On June 13, 2016, the company launched the Active Light, supplied by the Aurora Group, which users can control remotely to turn the bulb on and off and program lighting schedules.

On August 11, 2016, the company announced a partnership with IFTTT (If This, Then That) to allow the smart thermostat to connect to 300 additional products and services through expanded recipe-based automation.

In September 2016 Hive announced it will partner with Amazon Echo, allowing customers to use Alexa voice control to activate lighting, plugs and heating.

On September 27, 2016, the company launched two new smart LED bulbs that can be controlled to alter the colour and tone of the bulbs.

Effective December 31st, 2019 Centrica Hive Limited discontinued the direct sale of products and related services for Hive in the United States and Canada.

Marketplace
Energy efficiency targets set by UK energy industry regulator Ofgem aim to convert 53 million homes and small businesses to use smart gas and electricity meters by the end of 2020. Since this was announced, there has been an increase in partnerships between smart thermostat companies and utility companies.

Operations
The company is the only UK-based, connected homes organisation that provides an end-to-end service, including the creation and installation of devices while also providing customer support on an ongoing basis.

Beginning with 15 staff members, by 2015 this had grown to 200. The company offers services in the UK, the Republic of Ireland and North America.

Devices
The main devices offered include a smart thermostat, lightbulbs, motion sensors for doors and windows, and what the company refers to as a smart plug - all of which operate on an interconnected system that links to a central hub connected to the internet.

Devices can be controlled via the hub, either by using the company website or smartphone app (available on iOS and Android). Users can turn devices on and off both remotely and manually.

Criticism and controversy
In August 2015, a Which? investigation claimed that the Hive app was a "burglars dream" because it was sending data that was unencrypted, including heating schedules and away settings, posing a security risk to customers should their Wi-Fi be tapped into. The company was informed about the Which? investigation in May 2015 and immediately began encrypting previously vulnerable data.

There was criticism of Hive because users could only operate devices designed for the company's system, instead of integrating multiple platforms like companies such as nCube do. However, in August 2016 it was announced the partnership with IFTTT will allow for cross-platform collaboration.

Awards

References

External links
 

Home automation companies
Internet of things
Centrica